The Arpenteur was a brig owned by William Owen and John Ridley. It was wrecked at Hassell Beach in Cheyne Bay near Cape Riche when a gale ran it ashore 7 November 1849.

History
The Arpenteur was built using wood at Mahe in the Seychelles in 1839. It was originally registered in Port Louis in Mauritius. The vessel was purchased in 1847 by Owen and Ridley, who had it re-registered at Port Adelaide. The vessel was used to transport cargo between Singapore, Java and Adelaide.

In 1848 the Arpenteur, in the command of Captain Allen, was used to salvage the Wave, which was wrecked at Cheynes Beach. The owners of the Arpenteur acquired the salvage rights for the wreck of the Wave for £330. When it returned to Fremantle the Arpenteur had 27 tons of flour, 1,000 bushels of wheat, the rigging and sails that the crew had salvaged from the wreck.

On its final voyage the brig was in the command of Captain John Raines and was being used to transport mail from England that had been collected at Singapore and was to be delivered at Fremantle. Unable to enter Fremantle harbour due to storms, it sailed on to Albany but was unable to enter King George Sound as a result of strong gales and was damaged in the process.

Eventually the ship reached Cheynes Beach where it was in the process of loading whale oil when strong gales rose from the south west blowing the vessel ashore so that it foundered and was wrecked. All of the crew escaped and a small portion of the cargo was salvaged.

Wreck

See also
 List of places on the State Register of Heritage Places in the City of Albany

References

Heritage places in Albany, Western Australia
Maritime incidents in November 1849
Shipwrecks of Western Australia
Brigs of Australia